Futsal World Cup may refer to:

 FIFA Futsal World Cup
 AMF Futsal World Cup